Yagan (1795–1833), was an Indigenous Australian warrior.

Yagan may also refer to:
 Yağan, Aksaray, a village in Turkey
 Yagan people, an ethnic group of Argentina and Chile
 Yagan language, their language
 Yagan (dog), an extinct domesticated fox
 Yagan Railway, a Japanese railway company
 Yagan Square, in Perth, Western Australia
 Yagan (poetic form), a form of Burmese satirical poem

People with the name 
 Ben Yagan (born 1995), Belgian-Armenian football player who plays as a forward
 Hiraç Yagan (born 1989), Armenian football player who plays as a midfielder
 Ivan Yagan (born 1989), Armenian football player who plays as a forward
 Sam Yagan (born 1977), American Internet entrepreneur

See also 
 Jagan (disambiguation)
 Yaghan (disambiguation)
 Yakan (disambiguation)

Language and nationality disambiguation pages